Barda District is one of the 66 districts of Azerbaijan. It is located in the center of the country and belongs to the Aran Economic Region. The district borders the districts of Tartar, Agdam, Aghjabadi, Zardab, Agdash, and Yevlakh. Its capital and largest city is Barda. As of 2020, the district had a population of 157,500.

History 
Materials and coins found in archaeological excavations related to the period of Alexander the Great, Arakis, and Empire of Rome prove that the center of the district (Barda city) is one of the oldest centers, not only in Azerbaijan but also in the Middle East. According to 9th-century Arabian historian Al-Baladhuri, Barda was established in the period of Kavadh I, who was a Sassanid ruler, while according to 14th-century Iranian historian Hamdallah Mustawfi it was from the period of Alexander the Great (336–323 BC).

Barda became the center of the region ruled by the governor during the Sassanid period. During the reign of Kavadh I, Barda was surrounded by fortress walls. It was the capital of Albania in the 10th century. The center of the Albanian church was moved to Barda in 552 and was occupied by Iranian feudalists in 639. Thereafter, Barda received autonomy with the help of Javanshir, who was the ruler of Alban. It became a central part of Arran Province in 752. Barda was part of the Sassanid state until the 890s.

The remains of cultural items from the 2nd millennium BC to the late Middle Ages have been found and preserved in Barda. The cultural items include a Barda tomb built in 1322, remains of old city walls from the 6th century, the Ibrahim Mosque (18th-century cemetery), two bridges from the 7th–9th centuries on the Tartar River, the Axsadan Baba tomb of the 14th century, and an eight-point tomb in the village of Guloghlular from the 18th century. All of these findings are well-preserved by the government. In addition, the Juma mosque (built in Barda city in 1905), a 19th-century bathhouse, the 19th-century Ugurbeyli Mosque, the Bahman Mirza Mausoleum, and other historical and architectural monuments were found in Shirvanli village.

Barda consisted of two parts: Shahristan and Rabad. The city center was in Shahristan, which was surrounded by fortress walls. Meanwhile, there were craftsmen, merchants, and caravanserais in the place called Rabat.

Barda District was established in 1930 as an independent administrative unit.

Monuments 
Historical monuments left to date are as follows:
 Ibrahim Mosque (built in the 8th–9th centuries)
 Bahram Mirza Tomb
 “Akhsadan baba” Tomb 
 Barda Tomb
 “Torpag gala”
 Juma Mosque
 2 bridges over Tartar river

Economy 
Barda is well-developed agriculturally. The main agricultural sectors include grain and cotton growing. The economy is primarily based upon cattle-breeding, vegetable growing, and silkworm breeding.

Barda District has a developed industry. There are “Yag-Pendir” (“Butter-Cheese”) and “Garabag-Pambig” (“Grabag-Cotton”) OSJCs, cannery, etc. functioning in the district.

The district runs education, health, social, recreational and public catering facilities.

Population 
The population of the district was 143.9 thousand people until January 1, 2011. According to the official information dated 01.06.2012, the population of the region is 147700. Among the residents, there are 222 Karabakh war invalids, 438 martyrs, 884 Karabakh war veterans and 41 Great Patriotic War veterans.

According to the State Statistics Committee, as of 2018, the population of city recorded 155,400 persons, which increased by 24,800 persons (about 18.9 percent) from 130,600 persons in 2000. 78,900 of total population are men, 76,500 are women. More than 25,8 percent of the population (about 40,100 persons) consists of young people and teenagers aged 14–29.

Geographical location 
Barda city is located on the Kur-Araz lowland, 87 meters above sea level, in the center of the Karabakh plain. The region is bordered by the Tartar region in the west, Yevlakh region in the north, Aghdash region in the north-east and the east, Zardab region in the south-east along the Kur River and the Aghdam and Aghjabadi regions in the south.

Infrastructure 
The Yevlakh-Agdam railway, the Yevlakh-Lachin-Nakhchivan and Yevlakh-Agjabedi motorways pass through the region.

References

External links 
Azerbaijan Development Gateway 
Ministry of Culture and Tourism's history of Barda
belediyye.org

 
Districts of Azerbaijan